Jaguli Bilateral High School is a private secondary school in the village of Jaguli, in Gabtali Upazila of Bogra District, Bangladesh.

History
Jaguli Bilateral High School was established in 1912 during British rule. In 1916, there were 50 students and 3 teachers. In 1987, there were 130 students and 5 teachers. In 2016, there are 394 students attending.

Location
The school is located in the village of Jaguli in Gabtali Upazila.

References

1912 establishments in British India
Educational institutions established in 1912
High schools in Bangladesh
Schools in Bogra District